Gunnerside is a village in the Richmondshire district of North Yorkshire, England. The village lies between the River Swale and its tributary, Gunnerside Beck, in the Swaledale part of the Yorkshire Dales National Park.

History
The name of the village derives from an Old Norse personal name Gunnar and sætr meaning hill or pasture.

Gunnerside Ghyll (or Gunnerside Gill), a smaller valley running northwards, at right angles to the Swale valley (Swaledale), was the site of a major lead mining industry in Swaledale until the late nineteenth century. The beck that runs through the narrow valley, also called Gunnerside Gill, or Gunnerside Beck, rises between Rogan's Seat and Water Crag, and runs for  emptying into the River Swale at the site of Gunnerside New Bridge. The bridge carries the B6270 over the River Swale south of the village; it was rebuilt several times during the 19th century due to flooding. The current structure dates from around 1892 and is now grade II listed.

Gunnerside contains a Methodist Chapel, a part-time post office, and a working smithy/museum. The chapel was founded in 1789, but rebuilt in 1866. The structure is now grade II listed. A private building to the north of the crossroads in the village was the site of a Medieval corn mill, and in the early 20th century, a bus garage.

The village primary school is one of two sites of the Reeth and Gunnerside Schools. At the last Ofsted inspection in 2013, the primary school was rated as Good. At the foot of Gunnerside Ghyll is the Kings Head public house.

Local employment centres on clockmaking, hill farming, gamekeeping and construction, the latter concerned chiefly with the maintenance of traditional stone-built field walls, houses and barns.

Notable people
John Close, poet, was born in the village in 1816

See also
Operation Gunnerside, which may have got its name because the participants trained on a moor near to Gunnerside owned by Charles Hambro.

References

Sources

External links

 Map of the village buildings
 Gunnerside.info
 Gunnerside Gill and Swinner Gill Walk (web archive)
 Gunnerside burial records
 Gunnerside school

Villages in North Yorkshire
Swaledale